Hossein Nejabat is an Iranian conservative politician who served a member of the Parliament of Iran from 2012 to 2016, representing Tehran, Rey, Shemiranat and Eslamshahr.

References

1953 births
Living people
Members of the 7th Islamic Consultative Assembly
Members of the 8th Islamic Consultative Assembly
Members of the 9th Islamic Consultative Assembly
Deputies of Tehran, Rey, Shemiranat and Eslamshahr
Society of Devotees of the Islamic Revolution politicians
Alumni of Ustinov College, Durham
Iranian campaign managers